Granges may refer to:
Monastic granges, farming estates belonging to a monastery

The National Grange of the Order of Patrons of Husbandry (The Grange), an agricultural organization
Granges, Saône-et-Loire, a commune in France
Granges, Switzerland, a municipality of the canton of Fribourg
Granges-près-Marnand, a municipality of the canton of Fribourg, Switzerland
Granges-Paccot, a municipality of the canton of Fribourg, Switzerland
Grenchen (in German, "Granges" in French), a municipality of the canton of Solothurn, Switzerland
Gränges AB, previously Trafik AB Grängesberg-Oxelösund, a Swedish industrial and mining company

See also
 Grange (disambiguation)